Gerry Johnson (April 4, 1918 - January 24, 1990) was an American actress and television host, best known as the voice of Betty Rubble during seasons five and six of the animated television series The Flintstones.

Early life
Geraldine Adelaide Schreiber  was born in Jersey City, New Jersey. Johnson was a native of Los Angeles whose study of drama began when she was six years old. She won contests in drama at Madame Gordon's School for Girls and Beverly Hills High School and won the California Shakespearean Award. She graduated from Stanford University, where she majored in speech and drama.

Career
Among her many stage, TV, and screen credits, Johnson created and hosted her own TV variety show in Dallas, Texas, Gerry Johnson's Variety Fair in the 1950s and played Lady Bracknell in The Importance of Being Earnest and several characters in Under Milk Wood in the opening season of the Dallas Theater Center. While she worked in Dallas, TV Guide selected her as the winner of its Outstanding TV Personality in the Southwest award. After moving back to Los Angeles in 1961, she co-hosted on Red Rowe's Panorama Pacific.  

Johnson provided voices for The Flintstones and other Hanna-Barbera productions, and guest-starred on Bewitched. In 1964, she was hired by Joseph Barbera as the new voice of Betty Rubble for the final two seasons of The Flintstones, replacing Bea Benaderet who left the series due to scheduling conflicts while she was starring in the series Petticoat Junction Johnson provided the voice of a Frenchwoman, an Englishwoman and Betty in the 1966 feature film The Man Called Flintstone before departing from voice acting.

Personal life 
Johnson was married to Warren Johnson, who worked in public relations for Taylor Publishing Company. They had two children.

Filmography
My Dog, Buddy (1960) - Elizabeth Lynch
Bewitched - episode (1964) - A Vision of Sugar Plums - Mrs. Johnson 
The Flintstones - 52 episodes (1964-1966) - Betty Rubble/additional voices
The Atom Ant/Secret Squirrel Show (1965) - Additional Voices
The Man Called Flintstone (1966) - Betty Rubble

References

External links

1918 births
1990 deaths
American stage actresses
American television actresses
American radio actresses
Hanna-Barbera people
Actresses from New Jersey
20th-century American actresses